Otiothops is a genus of palp-footed spiders that was first described by W. S. MacLeay in 1839.

Species
 it contains forty-eight species, found in South America, the Caribbean, India, and Panama:
Otiothops alayoni Cala-Riquelme & Agnarsson, 2014 – Cuba
Otiothops amazonicus Simon, 1887 – Colombia, Brazil
Otiothops atalaia Castro, Baptista, Grismado & Ramírez, 2015 – Brazil
Otiothops atlanticus Platnick, Grismado & Ramírez, 1999 – Brazil
Otiothops baculus Platnick, 1975 – Brazil
Otiothops besotes Cala-Riquelme & Agnarsson, 2018 – Colombia
Otiothops birabeni Mello-Leitão, 1945 – Brazil, Argentina
Otiothops brevis Simon, 1893 – Venezuela
Otiothops calcaratus Mello-Leitão, 1927 – Colombia
Otiothops chicaque Cala-Riquelme, Quijano-Cuervo & Agnarsson, 2018 – Colombia
Otiothops clavus Platnick, 1975 – Brazil
Otiothops contus Platnick, 1975 – Brazil
Otiothops curua Brescovit, Bonaldo & Barreiros, 2007 – Brazil
Otiothops doctorstrange Cala-Riquelme & Quijano-Cuervo, 2018 – Colombia
Otiothops dubius Mello-Leitão, 1927 – Brazil
Otiothops facis Platnick, 1975 – Brazil
Otiothops franzi Wunderlich, 1999 – Venezuela
Otiothops fulvus (Mello-Leitão, 1932) – Brazil
Otiothops germaini Simon, 1927 – Brazil
Otiothops giralunas Grismado, 2002 – Guyana
Otiothops goloboffi Grismado, 1996 – Argentina
Otiothops gounellei Simon, 1887 – Brazil
Otiothops goytacaz Castro, Baptista, Grismado & Ramírez, 2015 – Brazil
Otiothops helena Brescovit & Bonaldo, 1993 – Brazil
Otiothops hoeferi Brescovit & Bonaldo, 1993 – Brazil
Otiothops iguazu Grismado, 2008 – Argentina
Otiothops inflatus Platnick, 1975 – Paraguay, Argentina
Otiothops intortus Platnick, 1975 – Trinidad
Otiothops kathiae Piacentini, Ávila, Pérez & Grismado, 2013 – Bolivia
Otiothops kochalkai Platnick, 1978 – Colombia
Otiothops lajeado Buckup & Ott, 2004 – Brazil
Otiothops loris Platnick, 1975 – Peru
Otiothops luteus (Keyserling, 1891) – Brazil
Otiothops macleayi Banks, 1929 – Panama, Colombia
Otiothops namratae Pillai, 2006 – India
Otiothops naokii Piacentini, Ávila, Pérez & Grismado, 2013 – Bolivia
Otiothops oblongus Simon, 1892 – St. Vincent, Trinidad, Venezuela, Guyana, Brazil
Otiothops payak Grismado & Ramírez, 2002 – Argentina
Otiothops pentucus Chickering, 1967 – Virgin Is.
Otiothops pilleus Platnick, 1975 – Brazil
Otiothops platnicki Wunderlich, 1999 – Brazil
Otiothops puraquequara Brescovit, Bonaldo & Barreiros, 2007 – Brazil
Otiothops recurvus Platnick, 1976 – Brazil
Otiothops setosus Mello-Leitão, 1927 – Brazil
Otiothops typicus (Mello-Leitão, 1927) – Brazil
Otiothops vaupes Cala-Riquelme, Quijano-Cuervo & Agnarsson, 2018 – Colombia
Otiothops walckenaeri MacLeay, 1839 (type) – Bahama Is., Cuba
Otiothops whitticki Mello-Leitão, 1940 – Guyana

See also
 List of Palpimanidae species

References

Araneomorphae genera
Palpimanidae
Spiders of the Indian subcontinent
Spiders of North America
Spiders of South America